The Huntress is an American crime drama that aired on the USA Network over subsequent summers of the 2000 and 2001 television seasons. It was inspired by a non-fiction book about bounty hunter Dottie Thorson. Thorson was the widow of bounty hunter Ralph "Papa" Thorson, the subject of the 1980 Steve McQueen film, The Hunter.

Plot

After she loses her husband to a car bomb, newly widowed Dottie Thorson and her daughter Brandi team up to pick up where her husband Ralph left off, to hunt down criminals that operate above the law.

Cast
Annette O'Toole as Dottie Thorson
Jordana Spiro as Brandi Thorson
Luis Antonio Ramos as Ricky Guzman
James Remar as Tiny Bellows
Michael Muhney as Mark Farrell

Episodes

External links 
 

American action television series
2000s American crime drama television series
USA Network original programming
Television series by Universal Television
2000 American television series debuts
2001 American television series endings